The women's 200 metres event at the 1992 World Junior Championships in Athletics was held in Seoul, Korea, at Olympic Stadium on 18 and 19 September.

Medalists

Results

Final
19 September
Wind: +0.3 m/s

Semifinals
18 September

Semifinal 1
Wind: +0.7 m/s

Semifinal 2
Wind: +0.3 m/s

Semifinal 3
Wind: +0.1 m/s

Heats
18 September

Heat 1
Wind: +0.6 m/s

Heat 2
Wind: +0.8 m/s

Heat 3
Wind: -0.1 m/s

Heat 4
Wind: -0.6 m/s

Heat 5
Wind: -0.5 m/s

Participation
According to an unofficial count, 35 athletes from 25 countries participated in the event.

References

200 metres
200 metres at the World Athletics U20 Championships